Bodianus vulpinus, the western pigfish, is a species of wrasse native to tropical and warm temperate waters of the Pacific Ocean, namely Western Australia.

Taxonomy
Bodianus vulpinus is placed within in the subgenus Verreo in Bodianus. The record of B. vulpinus from the Hawaiian Islands by some authors was eventually recognized as a distinct species, Bodianus bathycapros.

References

vulpinus
Taxa named by John Richardson (naturalist)
Fish described in 2006